KUBD, virtual and VHF digital channel 13, is a CBS-affiliated television station licensed to Ketchikan, Alaska, United States. Owned by Gray Television, it is operated as a full-time satellite of Juneau-licensed KYEX-LD (channel 5). KUBD's transmitter is located in downtown Ketchikan.

On cable, KUBD is available on channel 4 on GCI and KPU CommVision, the latter of which is owned by the City of Ketchikan.

History
The station went on the air April 1, 1995 as KNEB-TV, operating on analog channel 4. It became KUBD in 1998. Originally a TBN affiliate, the station switched to Pax (now Ion Television) when it launched in 1998 and joined CBS in 2000. It continued a secondary affiliation with Pax for some time after joining CBS.

KUBD launched their digital signal in early 2006 on channel 13. KUBD stayed on channel 13 when the digital switchover took place in 2009.

On December 9, 2013, Ketchikan Television filed to sell KUBD, along with KTNL-TV in Sitka and KXLJ-LD in Juneau, to Denali Media Holdings, a subsidiary of local cable provider GCI. The deal would make them sister stations to NBC affiliate KATH-LD in Juneau and its satellite KSCT-LP in Sitka, as well as fellow CBS affiliate KTVA in Anchorage, Alaska. The sale was completed on July 28, 2014.

Digital television
The station's digital signal is multiplexed:

See also
KTUU-TV
KAUU

References

External links

1995 establishments in Alaska
Ketchikan, Alaska
Television channels and stations established in 1995
UBD (TV)
Gray Television
CBS network affiliates